John Izzy Maurillo Canillo (born March 3, 2004), popularly known as Izzy Canillo or simply Izzy, is a Filipino actor. He was discovered by Star Circle Quest in 2009, winning first runner up. He was nominated for the PMPC Best Children's Show Host Award in 2010.

As part of ABS-CBN's 60th anniversary celebration, he was offered a role in the fantasy-drama My Little Juan, and the follow-up to the television series, Juan dela Cruz. He also performs in mall shows.

Filmography

Television series

Television shows

Awards and nominations

References

External links
 

2004 births
Living people
Star Magic
ABS-CBN personalities
Star Circle Quest participants
Filipino male child actors
Filipino male television actors
Filipino television personalities
People from Pasig